The 1943 Washington Huskies football team was an American football team that represented the University of Washington during the 1943 college football season. In its second season under head coach Ralph Welch, the team compiled a 4–1 record, finished in third place in the Pacific Coast Conference (PCC), was ranked twelfth in the final AP Poll, lost to USC in the Rose Bowl, and outscored its opponents 150 to 61. Jack Tracy was the team captain.

With manpower shortages on campuses due to World War II, the other five members of the PCC's Northern Division did not field teams this season (or the next); Washington's sole conference game was on New Year's Day in the Rose Bowl.

Schedule

NFL Draft selections
Four University of Washington Huskies were selected in the 1944 NFL Draft, which lasted 32 rounds with 330 selections.

References

Washington
Washington Huskies football seasons
Washington Huskies football